Centar Župa is a village and seat in the municipality of Centar Župa, North Macedonia. The town is inhabited mainly by Turks.

Demographics
Centar Župa is a new village formed by families who settled in the area and originate from the villages of Balanci, Bajramovci, Crno Boci, Golem Papradnik and Mal Papradnik.

As of the 2021 census, Centar Župa had 354 residents with the following ethnic composition:
Turks 304
Macedonians 33
Persons for whom data are taken from administrative sources 13
Albanians 4

According to the 2002 census, the village had a total of 800 inhabitants. Ethnic groups in the village include:
 Turks 714
 Macedonians 80
 Albanians 4
 Others 2

References

Villages in Centar Župa Municipality
Macedonian Muslim villages
Turkish communities in North Macedonia